The Titus House is a historic house at 406 East Center Street in Searcy, Arkansas.  It is a single story wood-frame structure, with broad gable roof, walls clad in stucco and weatherboard, and a stone foundation.  The roof's broad eaves have exposed rafter ends, and the gable ends feature decorative knee brackets.  A cross gable rises above the recessed porch, which is supported by tapered square posts resting on stone piers.  Built about 1925, it is a fine local example of Craftsman architecture.

The house was listed on the National Register of Historic Places in 1991.

See also
National Register of Historic Places listings in White County, Arkansas

References

Houses on the National Register of Historic Places in Arkansas
Houses completed in 1925
Houses in Searcy, Arkansas
National Register of Historic Places in Searcy, Arkansas
1925 establishments in Arkansas
Bungalow architecture in Arkansas
American Craftsman architecture in Arkansas